Get Well Soon is a 2014 French comedy film written and directed by Jean Becker.

Cast 
 Gérard Lanvin as Pierre Laurent 
 Fred Testot as Le capitaine Maxime Leroy 
 Jean-Pierre Darroussin as Hervé Laurent 
 Swann Arlaud as Camille 
 Daniel Guichard as Serge  
 Anne-Sophie Lapix as Florence   
 Claudia Tagbo as Myriam 
 Philippe Rebbot as Thierry 
 Mona Jabeur as Maëva 
 Louis-Do de Lencquesaing as The surgeon
 Isabelle Candelier as Claudine Laurent 
 Maurane as Françoise

References

External links 
 

2014 films
2014 comedy films
2010s French-language films
French comedy films
Films directed by Jean Becker
Films based on French novels
Films scored by Nathaniel Méchaly
Films with screenplays by Jean-Loup Dabadie
2010s French films